Waterfall Bay may refer to: 

 Waterfall Bay, Hong Kong
 Waterfall Bay, Papua New Guinea